The Gelug (also: Lupac) is a right tributary of the river Caraș (Karaš) in Romania. It discharges into the Caraș near Goruia.

References

Rivers of Romania
Rivers of Caraș-Severin County